Confluence: The Journal of Graduate Liberal Studies is an academic journal covering liberal studies that is published by the Association of Graduate Liberal Studies Programs. It was established in 1995 as the Journal of Graduate Liberal Studies and obtained its current name in 2006. The journal publishes both non-fiction and fiction, including essays, short stories, poetry, creative nonfiction, and visual arts.
The editor-in-chief is Steven A. Burr (Loyola University Maryland).

References

External links 
 

Literary magazines published in the United States
Biannual journals
Publications established in 1995
English-language journals